Soklai, or Sokla (Σόκλα), was a town of ancient Lycia, which per the Stadiasmus Patarensis was on a road from Acarassus, and another from Podalia.
 
Its site is unlocated.

References

Populated places in ancient Lycia
Former populated places in Turkey
Lost ancient cities and towns